
Lolo National Forest is a national forest located in western Montana, United States with the western boundary being the state of Idaho. The forest spans 2 million acres (8,000 km2) and includes four wilderness areas; the Scapegoat and the Selway-Bitterroot Wilderness are partially within the forest while the Welcome Creek and Rattlesnake Wildernesses are solely in Lolo National Forest. The forest was created in 1906 from 4 different previous forests which were combined for administrative purposes. Lolo National Forest is west of the Continental divide and has a biodiversity influenced by both continental and maritime weather creating a transitional forest that has a high number of different plant and tree species.

Western red cedar, larch and whitebark pine share the forest with a variety of spruce and fir tree species. Western red cedars grow larger in Lolo National Forest than any other tree species does anywhere in Montana, attaining over 8 feet (250 cm) in diameter and almost 200 feet (60 m) in height. In total, 1,500 plant species exist in the forest as well as 60 species of mammals, 20 varieties of fish and 300 species of birds. Large mammals found in Lolo National Forest include the grizzly, black bear,  cougar, timber wolf, mountain goat, bighorn sheep, elk, moose and mule deer. Both the bald and golden eagle reside in the forest along with trumpeter swan, herons and 30 varieties of ducks.

The forest has a dozen improved campgrounds and 700 miles (1,100 km) of hiking trails. There are over 100 named lakes and five rivers including the Flathead River. The city of Missoula, Montana is the location for the forest headquarters and is centrally positioned within sight of the forestlands. There are local ranger district offices in Huson, Missoula, Plains, Seeley Lake, and Superior.

In descending order of land area the forest is located in parts of Mineral, Missoula, Sanders, Granite, Powell, Lewis and Clark, Flathead, and Ravalli counties.

On December 16, 1931 part of Missoula National Forest was added, followed by portions of Selway National Forest in 1934 and part of Cabinet National Forest in 1954.

Special places
 Ninemile Wildlands Training Center - Located near Frenchtown, Ninemile Remount Depot listed on the National Register of Historic Places
 Lolo National Historic Trail - Historic network of trails traveled by the Nez Perce and Lewis and Clark.
 Savenac Historic Tree Nursery - Located near Haugan, former USDA Forest Service nursery designated a National Historic Site

See also
 List of forests in Montana

References

External links
 
 "Lolo National Forest: Special Places". Lolo National Forest.
 "Lolo National Historic Trail". Lolo National Forest.
 "Lolo National Forest Collection" (University of Montana Archives)

 
National Forests of Montana
National Forests of the Rocky Mountains
Bitterroot Range
Protected areas of Mineral County, Montana
Protected areas of Missoula County, Montana
Protected areas of Sanders County, Montana
Protected areas of Granite County, Montana
Protected areas of Powell County, Montana
Protected areas of Lewis and Clark County, Montana
Protected areas of Flathead County, Montana
Protected areas of Ravalli County, Montana
Protected areas established in 1906
1906 establishments in Montana
Chinook Jargon place names